The natural delimitation between the Pacific and South Atlantic Oceans by the Scotia arc (in Spanish: Delimitación natural entre los océanos Pacífico y Atlántico Sur por el arco de las Antillas Australes) is the title of a scientific theory developed in Chile in which it was postulated that the boundary between the Southeast Pacific Ocean and the Southwest Atlantic Ocean would not be the meridian of the Cape Horn, but rather the Scotia Arc, an underwater orographic chain which links the Tierra del Fuego archipelago with the Antarctic continent.

Origin

This presentation was made known by the Chilean delegation at the IV conference of the International Hydrographic Bureau - later International Hydrographic Organization -, held in Monte Carlo in 1952, and formally presented in 1954 to the International Association of Physical Oceanography, gathered at the 10th Assembly of the International Union of Geodesy and Geophysics, held in Rome. This motion was left to be studied at the 1957 meeting in Buenos Aires, but it was not carried out. The thesis was presented again in Toronto in 1957.

Scientific theory

The final elaboration of this thesis was the work, in 1952, of the Chilean admiral Rafael Santibáñez Escobar. It was based on scientific studies that showed a correlation between the characteristics of the waters of the Southeastern Pacific Ocean with respect to those surrounded by the Scotia Arc to the east and the Drake Pass through the west, called the Scotia Sea and the Austral Zone Sea (name with which Argentina and Chile agreed to give to the maritime space of unclear limits to the south of the Big Island of Tierra del Fuego that was the object of delimitation by the Treaty of Peace and Friendship signed by both countries in 1984). The equivalences are presented in all the variables analyzed, sharing the same attributes, both biological —flora and marine fauna—, geomorphological —depth, type and form of substrates— and hydrographic —temperature, color, viscosity, density, and salinity—. 

With regard to the tides, those of the Atlantic, in Rio Grande on the Big Island of Tierra del Fuego, are of great amplitude, of the order of 12 to 15 meters and even more. On the other hand, in the area located from Cape San Diego towards the south and southwest, they correspond to the tidal regime of the Southeast Pacific, of little amplitude, arriving already from the coast in front of the island Picton not to be more than one and a half meters. All this occurs because said sea is always occupied by waters coming from the Pacific Ocean, because the morphological conformation of the extreme south of America is inclined towards the southeast, while the Antarctic peninsula does it towards the northeast. Both emerged lands form an enormous funnel through which the Antarctic Circumpolar Current flows, which transports the waters of the southeast of the Pacific to the southwest Atlantic from west to east. In the Drake Pass, a branch of this current breaks off in an east-northeast direction, transporting the waters of the Pacific towards the South Atlantic Current, which is formed from the Atlantic current of Brazil, which flows from the northwest. The waters of the latter join with those originating in the Pacific, outside the Scotia Sea.

Therefore, the delimitation between the South Pacific and South Atlantic oceans should not be a meridian, like that of Cape Horn, but their natural division should be applied for their separation, that is, changing a border created as a human convention by one delineated by nature itself. This new oceanic geographic limit would be mounted on the Scotia arc, an oceanic volcanic arc and submarine mountain range that turns out to be the sunken continuation of the Andes mountain range and that connects with the Antarctic mountain range of the Antarctandes. Geologically it is a young orographic system with strong volcanism and significant seismicity.

The ridge of the Scotia forms a pronounced arc of at least 4350 km in length. It starts from the last eastern peaks of the island of the States, continues on the Burdwood Bank, continues towards the east emerging in the archipelago called South Antilles or Antartillas that includes the Shag Rocks, South Georgia, South Sandwich, South Orkneys and South Shetland, to form the Antarctic Peninsula.

To the east, the boundary is formed by the abyssal South Sandwich Trench, with depths of 8,325 meters below sea level. The collision of tectonic plates, such as the South American, Antarctic and the small Scotia Plate, is what produces the folding of the Earth's crust that originates this ridge.

Political considerations

After this theory was put forward, the Chilean government established its position on it regarding the southern maritime conflicts, especially in the so-called Beagle conflict. Therefore, Chile argued that the coasts of the southern islands Grande de Tierra del Fuego and States were bathed in waters belonging to the Pacific, counteracting Argentina thesis in which he postulated that the Bioceanic principle was also applicable in the waters south of the island of the States up to and including the Drake Pass.

The current ocean limit
For the international community, the limit of both oceans is the meridian of Cape Horn, at least from said Cape to the south, possibly also north of it to the Big Island of Tierra del Fuego.

It is not clear whether the oceanic limit jumps to the small and large islands located there, or surrounds them in some way. For some specialists, especially in the past, the section of the Scotia Arc that runs from west to east could be the dividing line between the Atlantic and Antarctic oceans. The latter is generally circumscribed from the north to more southern latitudes.

See also
 Scotia Plate
 South Georgia and the South Sandwich Islands sovereignty dispute
 Borders of the oceans

References

Subantarctic islands
Atlantic Ocean
Pacific Ocean
Disputed territories in South America